South Franconian or South Rhine Franconian is an Upper German dialect which is spoken in the northernmost part of Baden-Württemberg in Germany, around Karlsruhe, Mosbach and Heilbronn. Like closely related East Franconian it is a transitional dialect, which unites elements of Central German and Upper German.

The language area is located in the transient zone between Rhine Franconian dialects (Hessian and Palatinate German) in the north and Alemannic German (Low Alemannic and Swabian German) in the south. South Franconian is one of the High German dialects with the lowest number of speakers. South Franconian is not considered a separate dialect by some observers. The scope of South Franconian is disputed.

References

Upper German languages
Central German languages
German dialects
Languages of Germany